Salute is a 2022 Taiwanese biographical docudrama dance film written, directed and shot by Yao Hung-i, about the life of dancer Sheu Fang-yi. Starring Sheu herself, the film also features special appearances by Sun Tsui-feng, Bamboo Chen and Hsieh Ying-xuan. It received three nominations at the 59th Golden Horse Awards, and was released in theaters on November 11, 2022.

Premise

Cast
 Sheu Fang-yi as herself
 Sun Tsui-feng
 Bamboo Chen
 Hsieh Ying-xuan

Awards and nominations

References

External links
 
 

2022 films
2022 drama films
Taiwanese drama films
2020s Mandarin-language films
Taiwanese dance films
Taiwanese biographical films
2022 biographical drama films
Docudrama films